Emil and the Detectives is a 2001 German family film directed by Franziska Buch and starring Tobias Retzlaff, Anja Sommavilla, and Jürgen Vogel. It is based on the classic 1929 novel Emil and the Detectives by Erich Kästner.

Cast

References

External links

2001 films
Films based on children's books
Films based on German novels
Films based on works by Erich Kästner
Films set in Berlin
2000s German-language films
Remakes of German films
German children's films
2000s German films